Daniel John Welch (born 17 July 1982) is a British auto racing driver. During his career he has mostly driven for his family team, Welch Motorsport. He drove in the British Touring Car Championship from 2011 to 2016.  He is the son of former British rallycross driver John Welch.

Racing career
Born in Aldershot, Hampshire, Welch first began racing in the Formula Renault UK series, but never completed a full season. In 2007, he switched to tin tops, racing in the SEAT Cupra Championship.  He raced SEATs for the next few years in several one-make championships, taking two wins in the British SEAT Cupra Championship.

British Touring Car Championship

Welch Motorsport (2011–2016)

In 2011, he stepped up to the Dunlop MSA British Touring Car Championship, once again driving for his family team in a Proton Gen-2, built to the then-new NGTC regulations. He competed in the final half of the season from Snetterton onwards, finishing 22nd in the Drivers' Championship, having secured his first BTCC point at the penultimate race of the season at Silverstone.

Welch continued to race in the BTCC in 2012. He had his best weekend of the season at Oulton Park, finishing 6th in Race 1 and then holding off Matt Neal to claim 4th in Race 2. For this he won the HiQ Champagne Moment award, as voted for by fans. Welch finished the season 15th in the Drivers' Championship.

Welch and his team continued to compete in the BTCC in 2013, finishing 18th in the Drivers' Championship with a best result of 6th at Knockhill.  Welch finished 32nd in the 2014 Drivers' Championship after a disappointing season in which the team struggled with their new self-built engines.

After a difficult 2015 season, Welch revealed plans to sell their pair of Proton Gen-2 cars at the end of the season.

Racing record

Racing career summary

Complete British Touring Car Championship results
(key) (Races in bold indicate pole position – 1 point awarded in first race; races in italics indicate fastest lap – 1 point awarded all races; * signifies that driver lead race for at least one lap – 1 point awarded all races)

24 Hours of Silverstone results

References

External links
Welch Motorsport
BTCC official site

Living people
English racing drivers
Sportspeople from Aldershot
1982 births
British Touring Car Championship drivers
Porsche Carrera Cup GB drivers
Britcar 24-hour drivers
Ginetta GT4 Supercup drivers
Renault UK Clio Cup drivers
Sportspeople from Hampshire
24H Series drivers